Hysen Dedja (born 16 October 1960) is an Albanian football manager and former player.

Playing career
A former defender and captain of his hometown club Vllaznia Shkodër, he made his debut for them on 16 October 1978, his 18th birthday, against Flamurtari. He won two league titles and 3 domestic cups with the club.

Managerial career
Dedja coached Vllaznia three times winning the Albanian Cup in 1998. He also managed Bylish in the 1999-2000 UEFA Cup. In 2017, he became coach of Lushnja after 8 years without a club.

Personal life
His brother-in-law is Astrit Hafizi, who also played for Vllaznia and managed the club as well as the national team. His elder brother Menduh Dedja also played 13 years for Vllaznia.

Honours
 Player
Albanian Superliga: 2
 1983, 1992

Albanian Cup: 3
 1979, 1981, 1987

 Manager
Albanian Cup: 1
 1998

References

External links

1960 births
Living people
Footballers from Shkodër
Albanian footballers
Association football defenders
KF Vllaznia Shkodër players
Albanian football managers
KF Vllaznia Shkodër managers
KF Bylis Ballsh managers
KS Lushnja managers
Luftëtari Gjirokastër managers
KF Teuta Durrës managers
KF Laçi managers
FK Egnatia managers
Kategoria Superiore players
Kategoria Superiore managers